A bird rarities committee or bird records committee is a committee which exists to validate records of rare birds in a particular country or region.

Many countries have national rarities committees; in some areas, such as Europe, coverage is near-complete at a national level. European national committees are all members of the Association of European Rarities Committees.

Some countries have committees covering more localised areas - e.g. in the United States, most states have their own state records committee, and in Britain, each county has its own county records committee.

A records committee differs from a list committee in that the latter just compile a list of the species found in an area, and do not typically assess every individual record of the rare species.

See also

 List of the member committees of the Association of European Rarities Committees

Ornithological organizations